Miguel Mañara Vicentelo de Leca (3 March 1627 - 9 May 1679) was the main founder of the Hospital de la Caridad in Seville.

Life

Family background
Born in Seville, his family originated in Corsica. His father Tomás Mañara Leca y Colona had been born in Calvi.

Childhood

Youth

Wife's death

Mañara and the Hermandad de la Santa Caridad

Beginnings and appointment as elder brother

The Hospital de la Caridad

Mañara's work

Death

Reputation as a seducer

Appearances in literature 
In French literature Mañara was the subject of Prosper Merimée's novella Les Âmes du purgatoire (1834) and Alexandre Dumas's play Don Juan de Marana ou la chute d'un ange (1836). Théophile Gautier, Antoine de Latour, Edmond Haraucourt and Pierre-Paul Raoul Colonna de Cesari Rocca also wrote about him, whilst Maurice Barrès dedicated a chapter to him in Du sang de la volupté et de la mort (1900)

 Don Juan de Marana was also the title of an opera by the British writer Arnold Bennett. In the 20th century Apollinaire also wrote about him, whilst the brothers Manuel and Antonio Machado produced the play Don Juan de Mañara (1927). There is also a four-act opera with six music-frames by Henri Tomasi and a libretto adapted from Oscar Venceslas de Lubicz-Milosz's play Miguel Mañara. Finally, Esther van Loo produced a pseudo-historical biography  Le vrai Don Juan, Don Miguel Mañara, published in Paris in 1950.

External links
  Mañara, Valdés Leal y las postrimerías del Hospital de la Caridad de Sevilla
  Sitio web oficial de la Hermandad de la Santa Caridad de Sevilla
 Will: 
 transcripción parcial
 ficha bibliográfica de la copia en el Archivo de la Corona de Aragón, signatura COLECCIONES,Reserva,13. (con acceso an imágenes)

Bibliography
  Discurso de la verdad, Sevilla, 1778, en la imprenta de Don Luis Bexinez y Castilla, Impresor Mayor de la Ciudad, edición facsímil, Mairena del Aljarafe, 2007, Extramuros Edición.
  Carlos Ros Carballar, Miguel Mañara, caballero de los pobres, (2002), Editorial San Pablo.
  Juan Pablo Navarro Rivas, Miguel Mañara. El rico que sirvió a los pobres, (2017), Editorial Maratania.

References 

Spanish monks
17th-century Spanish nobility
People from Seville
Knights of Calatrava
1627 births
1679 deaths